Kevin McKee may refer to:

 Kevin McKee (footballer), Scottish footballer
 Kevin McKee (sledge hockey), American sledge hockey player
 Kevin McKee, a victim of The Troubles, see Disappeared (Northern Ireland)